Cvejić is a Serbian surname. Notable people with the surname include:

Biserka Cvejić (1923–2021), Serbian opera singer and university professor
Branko Cvejić (born 1946), Serbian actor

See also
Cvijić

Serbian surnames